The Yonkers Chiefs were an American basketball team based in Yonkers, New York that was a member of the American Basketball League.

The team was previously known as the Newark Bobcats. The team folded during their only season.

Year-by-year

Basketball teams in New York (state)
Defunct basketball teams in the United States
Basketball teams in the New York metropolitan area